Edmundo Carvajal Airport (also known as Macas Airport, is an airport serving Macas, the capital of Morona-Santiago Province in Ecuador. The airport is named for Edmundo Carvajal Flores, a former commander of the Ecuadorian Air Force (Fuerza Aérea Ecuatoriana).

Airlines and Destinations

Passenger

See also

Transport in Ecuador
List of airports in Ecuador

References

External links 
OurAirports - Macas
SkyVector - Macas
FallingRain - Macas Airport

Airports in Ecuador
Buildings and structures in Morona-Santiago Province